"Fever" is the debut single performed by Canadian DJ and producer B.Traits. It was released on 23 March 2012 as a digital download in the United Kingdom. The song features vocals from British singer Elisabeth Troy. It peaked at number 36 on the UK Singles Chart.

Music video
A music video to accompany the release of "Fever" was first released onto YouTube on 13 March 2012 at a total length of three minutes and three seconds.

Track listing

Charts and certifications

Charts

Certifications

Release history

References

2012 debut singles
B.Traits songs
2011 songs